The Hater is a 2020 Polish social thriller film directed by Jan Komasa and written by Mateusz Pacewicz. The plot centres around an expelled university student from Warsaw who attempts to steer the internet, causing widespread hatred and violence. It premiered on 6 March 2020 in Poland and went on to win the Best International Narrative Feature Award at Tribeca Film Festival.

Premise
Tomasz Giemza, a disgraced law student obsessed with the progressive, upper-class Krasucki family, takes a job at a public relations company. What seemed like just another assignment turns out to be a quickly developing troll farm, where he excels in the business of spreading fake news and online hatred targeting famous personalities, internet celebrities and politicians. With time, Tomasz begins to use his newly acquired skills in order to stalk, harass and ultimately control the Krasuckis.

Cast
 Maciej Musiałowski as Tomasz Giemza
 Vanessa Aleksander as Gabriela 'Gabi' Krasucka
 Agata Kulesza as Beata Santorska
 Danuta Stenka as Zofia Krasucka
 Jacek Koman as Robert Krasucki
 Maciej Stuhr as Paweł Rudnicki
 Adam Gradowski as Stefan 'Guzek' Guzkowski
 Jedrzej Wielecki as Staszek Rydel

Production
Principal photography began on 28 October 2018 and ended on 22 December. It was primarily filmed in Warsaw and surrounding areas.

The Hater is considered a sequel or a spin-off to Komasa's previous film Suicide Room (2011).

Release
The Hater was released in Poland on 6 March 2020. However, a few days after its release, cinemas and movie theaters were closed due to the COVID-19 pandemic. It was distributed worldwide in streaming by Netflix on 29 July 2020.

Reception

Critical response
The site's critical consensus reads, "The Hater can get carried away in its contrivances, but thriller fans will enjoy its ambitious and frenzied style." On Metacritic, it holds a weighted average score of 61 out of 100, based on 5 critics, indicating "generally favorable reviews". 

Ola Salwa on Cineuropa stated "The Hater is a thrilling tale of an anti-hero and of the survival of the fittest, which in this case means those who have a strong and agile thumb and index finger." Brian Tallerico from RogerEbert.com praised the film's interesting moral narrative. Variety positively reviewed the plot, stating that it "effectively integrates concerns about how easily people are manipulated". In an enthusiastic review for the Krakow Post Giuseppe Sedia  wrote: "Komasa deserves kudos for showing the process of polarization at work in Polish society, with all that the mayhem this could entail."

Awards
The Hater premiered at Tribeca Film Festival in the International Narrative Competition and won Best International Narrative Feature award. The jury comprised film professionals among whom were Danny Boyle and William Hurt.

References

External links
 
 

2020 films
2020 LGBT-related films
2020 thriller films
2020s Polish-language films
2020s political thriller films
Films about the Internet
Films about social media
Films produced by Anna Wasniewska-Gill
Films set in Warsaw
Films shot in Warsaw
Gay-related films
LGBT-related political thriller films
Polish LGBT-related films
Polish political thriller films
Polish-language Netflix original films